CRRC Luoyang Co., Ltd. is a railway locomotive manufacturing company, a subsidiary of CRRC, which is located in Luoyang, Henan in China, established in 1958, as Luoyang Locomotive Plant of Zhengzhou Railway Bureau. In 2007 the company was affiliated in CSR, and renamed CSR Luoyang Locomotive Co., Ltd.. In 2015, as of the merger of CSR and CNR, CRRC was established, the subsidiary was renamed this name.

External links
 

Luoyang
CRRC Group